Strymon bubastus, the disjunct scrub-hairstreak or Bubastus hairstreak, is a butterfly of the family Lycaenidae. It was described by Caspar Stoll in 1780. It is found in Puerto Rico, Venezuela, Colombia, Peru, Dominica and Grenada.

Subspecies
Strymon bubastus bubastus
Strymon bubastus ponce (Comstock & Huntington, 1943) (Antilles)

References

 Strymon sapota at Insecta.pro

bubastus
Butterflies of the Caribbean
Lycaenidae of South America
Butterflies described in 1780
Taxa named by Caspar Stoll